RHS Kanaris (L53) (Greek: ΒΠ Κανάρης) was a Type III  destroyer that was originally built for the British Royal Navy as HMS Hatherleigh.

General characteristics 
The Hunt class was meant to fill the Royal Navy's need for a large number of small destroyer-type vessels capable of both convoy escort and operations with the fleet. The Type III Hunts differed from the previous Type II ships in replacing a twin 4-inch gun mount by two torpedo tubes to improve their ability to operate as destroyers.

Displacement was  standard and  under full load.

Her main gun armament included four 4 inch (102 mm) QF Mk XVI guns (anti-ship and anti-aircraft) in two twin mounts, with a quadruple 2-pounder "pom-pom" gun and three Oerlikon 20 mm cannons providing close-in anti-aircraft fire. The ship's anti-aircraft armament may have been supplemented by two Bofors 40 mm guns. Two  torpedo tubes were fitted in a single twin mount, while two depth charge chutes, four depth charge throwers and 70 depth charges comprised the ship's anti-submarine armament. Type 291 and Type 285 radars was fitted, as was a Type 128 sonar.

Service 
The ship was laid down at the naval construction yard of Vickers-Armstrongs (Newcastle upon Tyne) on 12 December 1940. Before her completion, she was transferred to the Royal Hellenic Navy and commissioned on 27 July 1942, in order to relieve heavy losses of ships sustained by Greece during the German invasion of 1941. She was named after Admiral Konstantinos Kanaris, hero of the Greek War of Independence, and later Prime Minister of Greece.

She served throughout the Second World War and during the Greek Civil War. In 1959, she was returned to the Royal Navy and broken up for scrap in 1960.

See also 
 Konstantinos Kanaris
 Royal Navy
 Hellenic Navy
 Hunt-class destroyer

References

Publications

External links 

 RHS Kanaris (L53) at UBoat.net

Hunt-class destroyers of the Royal Navy
Ships built on the River Tyne
1941 ships
World War II destroyers of the United Kingdom
Hunt-class destroyers of the Hellenic Navy
World War II destroyers of Greece